The White Stag Group was a group of artists centred on the painters Basil Rakoczi and Kenneth Hall.

Founded in London in 1935, the group moved to Ireland in 1939 and stayed until after the Second World War where they gained Irish members like Thurloe Conolly, Paul Egestorff, Stephen Gilbert and Patrick Scott. Their group philosophy, which they called Subjectivist Art, was not associated with any particular style or set belief. Instead, it encouraged an exploration of psychology and of modernist ideas. They also believed in aesthetic experimentation and aesthetics as an objective in art. Although formed in London and guided by two British born artists (Hall and Rakozci) the group has been described as "an Irish phenomenon" by the Irish art expert Dr. S.B. Kennedy.

The group was at the vanguard of modern artistic ideas in Ireland, were involved in the Irish Exhibition of Living Art and influenced Patrick Scott, Gerald Dillon and Louis le Brocquy. The Irish composer Brian Boydell, at that time a visual artist, was also a member of the group. The Irish Museum of Modern Art put on a White Stag retrospective during the summer of 2005.

Bibliography
S.B. Kennedy: The White Stag Group (Dublin: Irish Museum of Modern Art, 2005), .

References

External links
 The Irish Museum of Modern Art announce their White Stag exhibition.
 irishabroad.com  article on Irish art during the Emergency with a discussion of the White Stag Group.

British artist groups and collectives
British art
Irish art
Arts organizations established in 1935